Marc Lütolf (born 24 June 1987) is a former Swiss footballer.

In February 2008 he joined Gossau. He was released in February 2010.

In May 2010, Lütolf and former teammate Darko Damjanović, Mario Bigoni were given open-ended suspensions after involved in the 2009 European football betting scandal.

Her played for Swiss U20 team at 2006–07 and 2007–08 Four Nations Tournament.

References

External links
football.ch  
 

Swiss men's footballers
Grasshopper Club Zürich players
FC Gossau players
Swiss Super League players
1987 births
Living people
Association football defenders